Jacovce is a municipality in the Topoľčany District of the Nitra Region, Slovakia. In 2011 it had 1770 inhabitants. Jacovce is a birthplace of Slovak ice-hockey star Miro Šatan.

Notable people
 Ladislav Jurkemik, football player and manager

See also
 List of municipalities and towns in Slovakia

References

Genealogical resources

The records for genealogical research are available at the state archive "Statny Archiv in Nitra, Slovakia"

External links
http://en.e-obce.sk/obec/jacovce/jacovce.html
Official homepage
Surnames of living people in Jacovce

Villages and municipalities in Topoľčany District